The earth is constantly monitored by several satellites operating in the earth exploration-satellite service (EESS) or space research service (SRS). These artificial satellites have onboard space radio stations from which they gather data. The data is transmitted back to earth via feeder links. This article lists a number of current active Earth observation satellites and their downlink transmission frequencies.

Frequency assignments

See also 
 List of Earth observation satellites
 Radio waves
 Frequency allocation

References

External links 
 Transmission at the S band

Earth observation satellites
Radio spectrum